Elmer Lloyd Rundell (September 15, 1879 – October 20, 1968) was a member of the Wisconsin State Assembly.

Early life
Rundell was born in Livingston, Wisconsin, the son of Albert and Nancy (née Fruit) Rundell. Rundell graduated from the University of Wisconsin-Platteville.

Career
Rundell was first elected to the Assembly in 1940. He was a Republican.

References

External links

People from Livingston, Wisconsin
Republican Party members of the Wisconsin State Assembly
University of Wisconsin–Platteville alumni
1879 births
1968 deaths